Aaliyah Palestrini (born 1 October 2003) is a Seychellois swimmer. She represented Seychelles at the 2019 World Aquatics Championships held in Gwangju, South Korea. She competed in the women's 50 metre breaststroke and women's 50 metre butterfly events. In both events she did not advance to compete in the semi-finals. She also competed in the 4 × 100 metre mixed freestyle relay event.

In 2018, she competed in the girls' 50 metre backstroke and girls' 100 metre freestyle events at the Summer Youth Olympics held in Buenos Aires, Argentina. In both events she did not advance to compete in the semi-finals.

References

External links
 

Living people
2003 births
Place of birth missing (living people)
Seychellois female swimmers
Female backstroke swimmers
Female breaststroke swimmers
Female butterfly swimmers
Seychellois female freestyle swimmers
Swimmers at the 2018 Summer Youth Olympics
Swimmers at the 2018 Commonwealth Games
Swimmers at the 2022 Commonwealth Games
Commonwealth Games competitors for Seychelles
21st-century Seychellois people